Will Gardiner (born 21 May 2001) is a professional  rugby league footballer who plays as a  and  for Hull F.C. in the Betfred Super League.
In 2022 he made his Hull début in the Super League against Salford Red Devils.

References

External links
Hull FC profile

2001 births
Living people
English rugby league players
Hull F.C. players
Rugby league players from Kingston upon Hull
Rugby league props